My Lucky Star may refer to:

 My Lucky Star (TV series), a Taiwanese drama
 My Lucky Star (novel), a novel by Joe Keenan
 My Lucky Star (1933 film), a UK comedy starring Florence Desmond
 My Lucky Star (1938 film), a film starring Sonja Henie
 My Lucky Star (1963 film), a Hong Kong film featuring Tien Feng
 My Lucky Star (2003 film), a Hong Kong film starring Tony Leung Chiu-Wai
 My Lucky Star (2013 film), a Chinese film produced by and starring Zhang Ziyi
 "My Lucky Star", a song from the Broadway musical Follow Thru
 My Lucky Stars, a 1985 Hong Kong action-comedy film starring Jackie Chan

See also
Lucky Star (disambiguation)